Igreja de São Gens de Boelhe is a church in Penafiel, Portugal. It is classified as a National Monument.

Churches in Porto District
National monuments in Porto District